Ronald Bruce Clark (born January 14, 1943) is an American former professional baseball third baseman, shortstop, and second baseman, who played in Major League Baseball (MLB) for the Minnesota Twins (1966–1969), Seattle Pilots (1969), Oakland Athletics (1971–72), Milwaukee Brewers (1972), and Philadelphia Phillies (1975). During a seven-year big league career, Clark batted .189, with five home runs, and 43 runs batted in (RBI).

Clark graduated from Brewer High School in Fort Worth, Texas. Before the 1961 season, he was signed by the Philadelphia Phillies as an amateur free agent (prior to the draft).

Clark helped the Twins in the first half of the 1969 season en route to the team winning the American League West. He also contributed to the Athletics’ successes in getting to the 1971 AL Western Division series and the 1972 World Series championship.

After retiring as an active player, Clark remained with the Phillies organization as a minor league manager. He began with the 1978 Spartanburg Phillies of the Western Carolinas League, then managed the Peninsula Pilots, Reading Phillies, Oklahoma City 89ers, and Clearwater Phillies.

References

External links

Ron Clark at SABR  (Baseball BioProject)

1943 births
Living people
Bakersfield Bears players
Baseball players from Fort Worth, Texas
Caribbean Series managers
Charlotte Hornets (baseball) players
Chicago White Sox coaches
Cleveland Indians coaches
Denver Bears players
El Paso Sun Kings players
Florida Instructional League Red Sox players
Florida Instructional League Twins players
Hawaii Islanders players
Iowa Cubs managers
Iowa Oaks players
Kansas City Royals scouts
Major League Baseball shortstops
Major League Baseball third basemen
Milwaukee Brewers players
Minnesota Twins players
Oakland Athletics players
Philadelphia Phillies players
Reading Phillies managers
Salt Lake City Angels players
San Jose Bees players
Seattle Mariners coaches
Seattle Pilots players
Tigres de Aragua players
American expatriate baseball players in Venezuela
Toledo Mud Hens players
Wilson Tobs players